Herher or Gargar is a village de facto in the Martuni Province of the breakaway Republic of Artsakh, de jure in the Khojavend District of Azerbaijan, in the disputed region of Nagorno-Karabakh. The village has an ethnic Armenian-majority population, and also had an Armenian majority in 1989.

History 
During the Soviet period, the village was a part of the Martuni District of the Nagorno-Karabakh Autonomous Oblast.

Historical heritage sites 
Historical heritage sites in and around the village include the St. Grigoris Church built between 1667 and 1676 by Bishop Barsegh of the Amaras Monastery, originally from the village of Gishi, as a summer residence for the monastery's monks. Also located near the village is the 17th-century St. Astvatsatsin Chapel, and a 17th/18th-century cemetery.

Economy and culture 
The population is mainly engaged in agriculture and animal husbandry. As of 2015, the village has a municipal building, a house of culture, a secondary school, two shops, and a medical centre.

Demographics 
The village had 577 inhabitants in 2005, and 584 inhabitants in 2015.

Gallery

References

External links 

 

Populated places in Martuni Province
Populated places in Khojavend District